Malonyl-CoA:4-coumaroyl-CoA malonyltransferase (cyclizing) may refer to:
 Trihydroxystilbene synthase
 Naringenin-chalcone synthase